KZZS (98.3 FM Wyoming's Lite-FM, 98-3 The Peak) is a radio station broadcasting an Adult Contemporary format. Licensed to Story, Wyoming, United States, the station serves the Sheridan area, along with most of northeastern Wyoming. The station is currently owned by Big Horn Mountain Radio Network, a division of Legend Communications of Wyoming, LLC, and features programming from Westwood One.

KZZS is located at 1221 Fort Street, west of Buffalo, along with KBBS, and KLGT. KLGT and KZZS share a transmitter site off East Eby Road, in Story, WY. Sister station KHRW has its studios at 324 Coffeen Avenue in Sheridan.

History
The station was assigned the call sign KHWC on April 17, 2001.  On August 17, 2001, the station changed its call sign to the current KZZS.

References

External links

ZZS
Hot adult contemporary radio stations in the United States
Sheridan County, Wyoming